Hospitalitermes monoceros, is a species of nasute termite of the genus Hospitalitermes. It was originally considered to be endemic to Sri Lanka, but was also found in India in 2013. It is an obligate lichen feeder. It is recorded from Cassia multijuga and Ficus religiosa trees and is a pest of tea.

References

External links
A new species of open-air processional column termite, Hospitalitermes nigriantennalis sp. n. (Termitidae), from Borneo
Termites on Ceylon tea estates.

Termites
Insects described in 1779
Insects of Sri Lanka